Monachidium lunum is a species of grasshoppers belonging to the family Acrididae.

Description
These locusts show an astonishing aposematic pattern. Head and prothorax are yellow tan, prothorax has a high fairing, elytra are blackish green opaque, with trasversal yellow bands. Wings are dark blue, sometimes metallic violet. The abdomen is red and black. Antennae are yellow. Legs and tarsi are red.

Distribution
This species is present in South America (Brazil, French Guiana).

References

Acrididae
Insects described in 1763

Orthoptera of South America
Fauna of French Guiana
Insects of Brazil
Monotypic Orthoptera genera